This is a list of railway stations which at some time have been private halts. It details the name of the railway station, its location, dates where known, reason for its existence and any additional information that may aid the researcher. The station names in bold are still available for use today.

See also
Private railway station
List of private railway stations

References

Private